Ahmadullah Shah (1787 – 5 June 1858) famous as Maulvi of Faizabad, famous freedom fighter and was a leader of the Indian Rebellion of 1857. Maulavi Ahmadullah Shah was known as the Lighthouse of Rebellion in Awadh region. British officers like George Bruce Malleson and Thomas Seaton made mentions about the courage, valour, personal and organizational capabilities of Ahmadullah. G. B. Malleson mentions Ahmadullah repeatedly in the History of Indian Mutiny, a book written in 6 volumes covering Indian revolt of 1857. Thomas Seaton describes Ahmadullah Shah as:

Being a practicing Muslim, he was also an epitome of religious unity and Ganga-Jamuna culture of Faizabad. In the rebellion of 1857, royalties like Nana Sahib and Khan Bahadur Khan fought alongside Ahmadullah.

The British could never catch Maulavi alive. The price of 50,000 pieces of silver was announced to capture him. Finally the king of Powayan, Raja Jagannath Singh killed Maulvi, beheaded and presented his head to the British for which Raja Jagannath was paid the announced prize. Next day, the head of Maulvi was hanged at Kotwali.

Family 
The family of Ahmadullah was original inhabitant of Gopamau village in Hardoi district. His father Ghulam Hussain Khan was a military general in Sultan Hyder Ali's Mysore Army. His forefathers were big exponents of weaponry. G. B. Malleson describes personality of Maulvi as 

The Moulvi was a remarkable person. His name was Ahmad-ullah and his native place was Faizabad in Oudh. In person, he was tall, lean and muscular, with large deep eyes, beetle brows, a high aquiline nose, and lantern jaws.

Maulvi was a Sunni Muslim and belonged to an affluent family. He had a good command over English. After getting his traditional Islamic education, Maulvi had got training on welfare as well. He travelled to England, Russia, Iran, Iraq, Mecca and Medina, and also performed Hajj.

Before 1857 Revolt
Maulvi Ahmadullah Shah believed that for the success for an armed rebellion, the co-operation of people was very important. He travelled to Delhi, Meerut, Patna, Calcutta and several other places and sowed the seed of independence. Maulvi and Fazl-e-Haq Khairabadi also declared jihad against Britons. He also authored a pamphlet called Fateh Islam, planned manner for the need of jihad against Britisher, even before the eruption of revolt in 1857.

According to G. B. Malleson, "It is beyond doubt that behind the conspiracy of 1857 revolt, Moulavi's brain and efforts were significant. Distribution of bread during the campaigns, Chapati Movement, was actually his brainchild."

Arrest at Patna
According to G. B. Malleson, when Maulvi was in Patna, suddenly with no previous notice or intimation, an officer arrived at Patna from Punjab. He is referred as Lt. Thursbern in a book by Rashmi Kumari on Ahmadullah Shah. With a warrant in his pocket, he walked into Sadikpur, a quarter in Patna. He entered house of Ahmadullah Shah, and with the help of police arrested Maulvi Ahmadullah Shah. Maulvi was awarded capital death punishment on the charges of revolt and conspiracy against the British rule. The punishment was later reduced to life imprisonment.

After eruption of revolt on 10 May 1857, Rebel sepoys of Azamgarh, Banaras and Jaunpur reached Patna on 7 June. They attacked the bungalows of English officers who were already on the run. Once the city was captured by the rebels, they captured the government treasury. They proceeded towards the jail and got Maulvi and other prisoners freed. After declaring Mansingh as Raja of Patna, maulavi Ahmadullah proceeded to Awadh.

Indian Rebellion of 1857 and 1858
The rebel army of Awadh was led by Barkat Ahmad and Maulvi Ahmadullah Shah. In the Battle of Chinhat, Barkat Ahmad was declared Chief Army Officer of the rebels. Britisher army was led by Henry Montgomery Lawrence who eventually died in The Residency, Lucknow. This fierce battle was won by rebel army in the leadership of Barkat Ahmad and Maulvi Ahmadullah Shah.

Ahmadullah Shah also led an attack on Beligarad. The writer Kaisaruttawarikh states that it was a huge victory for the rebels.

Maulavi fought with great courage and chivalry in real sense, and for that he succeeded in pushing the British to beligarad. And then a big house of "Machchhi Bhavan" was also blown up.

After Lucknow was captured by rebels, Birjis Qadr, ten-year-old son of Wazid Ali Shah and Begum Hazrat Mahal was declared a king. Maulavi resisted being part of new administration. He went away from the palace politics and established his camp with Ghamandi Singh and 1000 soldiers of subedar Umrao Singh in Badshah Bagh beyond river Gomati.

On 6 March 1858, Britishers attacked Lucknow again under the leadership of Sir Colin Campbell, a reputed British army official. The rebel army was led by Begum Hazrat Mahal. With the Capture of Lucknow by the British, the rebels escaped on 15 and 16 March through a road leading to Faizabad. The last rebels, 1,200 men under Ahmadullah Shah were driven from a fortified house in the centre of the city on 21 March. The city was declared cleared on this date.

After fall of Lucknow, Maulavi shifted his base to Shahjahanpur, Rohilkhand. In Shahjahanpur, forces of Nana Sahib and Khan Bahadur Khan also joined maulavi in attacking Britishers.

Colin Campbell departed from Shahjahanpur on 2 May towards Bareilly. Maulvi, with king of Mohammadi and several thousand soldiers attacked Shahjahanpur. The British Army was informed and General Brigadier John reached Shahjahanpur on 11 May. Jones could not muster courage to attack moulavi and kept waiting for more assistance from Bareilly. George Bruce Malleson writes that:

Maulavi was the only one who could have dared to defeat Sir Colin Campbell twice.

The fierce battle took place on 15 May 1858 between platoon of rebels and regiment of General Brigadier Jones. Both sides had to bear heavy losses but rebels still controlled Shahjahanpur. Colin reached Shahjahanpur on 20 May, and attacked Shahjahanpur from all sides. This battle continued all night long. Maulavi and Nana Sahib left Shahjahanpur. It is said that Colin himself followed maulvi but couldn't capture him. After fall of Shahjahanpur, maulvi left for Powayan which was situated 18 miles north of Shahjahanpur.

Death
The British could never catch Maulvi alive. They announced 50,000 pieces of silver as a prize to capture maulvi. Maulvi Ahmadullah Shah wanted to induce The king of Powayan, Raja Jagannath Singh to revolt against Britishers, but the latter did not give into the Maulvi's wishes. When Maulvi reached gates of his palace on his war elephant, king attacked him by firing a cannon shot. This killed maulvi who came down falling from his elephant. G. B. Malleson describes his death as:

The brother of The king of Powayan Raja Jagannath Singh, Kunwar Baldeo Singh killed Maulvi Ahmadullah Shah, beheaded him and presented it to the magistrate. He was paid announced prize and gained favour of the British. The head of Maulvi was hanged at kotwali next day. Another revolutionary of 1857 Fazl-e-Haq Khairabadi witnessed the death of maulvi.

Legacy 

The to-be-constructed  mosque in Ayodhya as per the verdict of Supreme Court of India in Babri Masjid demolition case, will be named after Ahmadullah Shah.

See also

Indian independence movement
Fazl-e-Haq Khairabadi 
Barkat Ahmad
Bakht Khan
Begum Hazrat Mahal
Khan Bahadur Khan Rohilla
Shah Waliullah Dehlawi
Nana Sahib
Siege of Lucknow
Battle of Chinhat
Capture of Lucknow
Indian Rebellion of 1857

References

Further reading
 
 

1787 births
1858 deaths
Revolutionaries of the Indian Rebellion of 1857
19th-century Muslim scholars of Islam
Indian Sufi religious leaders
Sunni Sufis
Indian Sufis
Indian independence activists from Uttar Pradesh
People from Faizabad
Indian independence activists
People executed by decapitation
Indian people of the Indian Rebellion of 1857
Works about the Indian Rebellion of 1857
People from Chennai
Madras Presidency